The 2011–12 FC Krasnodar season was the club's 1st season in the Russian Premier League, the highest tier of football in Russia. They finished the season in 9th place. The 2011–12 in Russian football season stretched over 18 months and featured games from both the 2010–11 and 2011–12 Russian Cup, Krasnodar were eliminated at the Quarterfinal stage by Spartak Moscow in the 2010–11 competition and at the Round of 32 stage by Fakel Voronezh in the 2011–12.

Squad

Out on loan

Transfers

Winter 2010–11

In:

Out:

Summer 2011

In:

Out:

Winter 2011–12

In:

Out:

Competitions

Russian Premier League

Matches

Table

Russian Premier League – Relegation group

Matches

League table

Russian Cup

2010–11

2011–12

Squad statistics

Appearances and goals

|-
|colspan="14"|Players who left Krasnodar on loan during the season:

|-
|colspan="14"|Players who appeared for Krasnodar who left during the season:

|}

Goal scorers

Disciplinary record

References

FC Krasnodar seasons
FC Krasnodar